Viplavakarikal is a 1968 Indian Malayalam film, directed by Mahesh and produced by P. Subramaniam. The film stars Madhu, K. V. Shanthi, Muthukulam Raghavan Pillai and Ramachandran in the lead roles. The film had musical score by G. Devarajan.

Cast
Madhu as Madhava Menon/Raghavan
K. V. Shanthi as Leela
Muthukulam Raghavan Pillai
Ramachandran
Bahadoor as Govindan
Vijaya Lalitha as Radha
Kamaladevi as Kamakshi
Nellikode Bhaskaran as Vaasu
Paravoor Bharathan as Sankaran
T. K. Balachandran as Ravi
Sri Narayanapilla
Ramachandran
K. Annamma

Soundtrack
The music was composed by G. Devarajan and the lyrics were written by Vayalar Ramavarma.

References

External links
 

1968 films
1960s Malayalam-language films